Stamford station could refer to:

Stamford railway station in Lincolnshire, England.
Stamford East railway station  in Lincolnshire, England.
Stamford (Metro-North station) in Connecticut, USA.
Stamford Railroad Station (New York) former station in New York, USA.
Stamford railway station (Queensland) in Stamford, Queensland, Australia

The following stations also have Stamford in their names:

Stamford Brook tube station in London, England
Stamford Hill railway station in London, England

See also
 Springdale (Metro-North station) in a suburb of Stamford, Connecticut
 Stanford station, a Caltrain station in Palo Alto, California
 Stanford-le-Hope railway station in Essex, England